The South Pacific Coast Railroad (SPC) was a  narrow gauge steam railroad running between Santa Cruz, California and Alameda, with a ferry connection in Alameda to San Francisco. The railroad was created as the Santa Clara Valley Railroad, founded by local strawberry growers as a way to get their crops to market in San Francisco and provide an alternative to the Southern Pacific Railroad. In 1876, James Graham Fair, a Comstock Lode silver baron, bought the line and extended it into the Santa Cruz Mountains to capture the significant lumber traffic coming out of the redwood forests.

History

Origins

SPC was incorporated in 1876 to purchase the unfinished Santa Clara Valley Company railroad at Dumbarton Point. Dumbarton Point was then a landing to transfer agricultural produce from the Santa Clara Valley for transport to San Francisco. Railway shops were built in Newark and a  narrow gauge line to San Jose was completed in 1876. The SPC ferry Newark offered connecting service from Newark to San Francisco in 1877. In 1878 the SPC was extended from San Jose to Los Gatos; and the subsidiary Bay and Coast Railroad completed a line of trestles and fill along the eastern edge of San Francisco Bay from Newark to Alameda. The ferry connection to San Francisco shifted to Alameda as SPC ferrys Bay City and Garden City increased the frequency and reliability of connecting service.

Two years and eight tunnels were required to extend the SPC through the Santa Cruz Mountains from Los Gatos to California's third busiest seaport at Santa Cruz in 1880. SPC leased the San Lorenzo Flume and Transportation Company to acquire their subsidiary Santa Cruz and Felton Railroad as a route through the city to Santa Cruz municipal pier. The big lumber transport flume was replaced by a  logging branch in 1883. In 1886 another branch line was built to the New Almaden mercury mine; and the SPC main line was extended from Alameda to Oakland. Additional horsedrawn branch lines served Centerville (now Fremont) and Agnews State Hospital. Commuter trains fed the San Francisco ferries from east bay communities, two daily trains served Santa Cruz, and four daily locals served the logging branch to Boulder Creek. Excursion trains ran from the ferries to resorts of the south bay and Santa Cruz Mountains. Freight trains carried redwood lumber, mercury, sacked lime, gunpowder from the California Powder Works, and local agricultural produce.

Southern Pacific control

By 1887 SPC was a major California transportation concern; and Southern Pacific paid six million dollars to merge it into their California transportation system (equivalent to $ in ). An 1893 winter storm caused a landslide in the Santa Cruz Mountains requiring major reconstruction to restore service. The Alameda ferry terminal burned in 1902 and was replaced with the modern terminal which survived until ferry service was discontinued by the San Francisco–Oakland Bay Bridge in 1939. The  gauge line had 23 locomotives, 85 passenger cars and 500 freight cars before the conversion to standard gauge began. The transition to standard gauge was interrupted by the 1906 San Francisco earthquake. The bridge across San Leandro Bay was damaged and abandoned. Conversion to standard gauge was completed in 1909.  narrow gauge locomotives numbered 9, 23, and 26 were eventually acquired by the Ilwaco Railway and Navigation Company. Other SPC  gauge equipment was sold to the Carson and Colorado Railway, the White Pass and Yukon Route, the Nevada County Narrow Gauge Railroad, the Pacific Coast Railway, the Lake Tahoe Railway and Transportation Company, and the Northwestern Pacific Railroad.

Standard gauge operation

The track in Alameda could only be used for local service after being isolated by the 1906 earthquake. It was electrified in 1911 and operated as part of the SP's East Bay Electric Lines until 1941. The remaining line from San Jose to San Leandro Bay became part of the Southern Pacific coast division main line.

However, the southern end of the system from San Jose to Santa Cruz was reclassified as a branch line by 1915, useful only to lighter locomotives, as two or three were required to move trains over the grade. Beginning in 1927, it was used by SP's Suntan Special seasonal excursion trains which came down the San Francisco Peninsula every summer Sunday and took passengers right to the Santa Cruz Beach Boardwalk. The Boulder Creek branch was dismantled in 1934 after a few years of service by a McKeen railmotor. The tracks through the Santa Cruz Mountains suffered major damage during a storm in February 1940. The last train ran on 26 February 1940 and the line was officially abandoned on 4 June 1940.

The line from San Jose to Los Gatos remained in freight service after the last commuter train ran in 1955. The two southernmost tunnels (#8/Mission Hill and #6/Rincon) continued to be used until 1993, when a fire inside the Rincon Tunnel led to a landslide which collapsed it. The Santa Cruz depot was used for SP's surviving coastal line from Watsonville Junction until the building was sold the 1970s and converted to a restaurant.

Tunnels

Eight tunnels were built on the line, of which two survive (#5/Zayante and #8/Mission Hill), although only the Mission Hill tunnel still carries rail traffic. Two were daylighted during or prior to the conversion to standard gauge. 

Three of these tunnels were sealed shortly after the line was abandoned: #2/Summit, #3/Glenwood (Laurel), and #4/Mountain Charlie (Clems). Under contract to Southern Pacific, the F.A. Christie railroad salvage firm removed the track and trestles and, when this was completed in April 1942, dynamited these three tunnels. Although a long-persistent rumor holds that destruction of the tunnels was motivated by post-Pearl Harbor fears of a Japanese invasion of the United States West Coast, the decision to dynamite them predated the Pearl Harbor attack and was made solely for business reasons. Tunnel #5/Zayante was also part of the abandoned line, but it was used as a private road after the tracks were abandoned and then as a storage site.

Narrow gauge locomotives

Ferry service
The first ferry terminal was built on Dumbarton Point in 1876.  The Alameda terminal opened on 20 March 1878 for a shorter ferry ride to San Francisco.  With two ferries, the company offered hourly trips between Alameda and San Francisco beginning in July 1878.  These three side-wheel passenger ferries with vertical beam engines saw service on other routes under Southern Pacific ownership.

Newark
Southern Pacific transferred Newark to their Oakland pier for runs to San Francisco.  Newark suffered minor flooding when rammed in fog by the Southern Pacific ferry Oakland on 7 December 1908.  Newark was disabled by a mid-bay engine failure on 9 November 1920, and drifted more than an hour before being towed ashore by tugs.  Newark was taken into the Southern Pacific shipyard in 1923 and rebuilt into the largest all-passenger ferry on San Francisco Bay.

The rebuilt ferry was named Sacramento when launched in January 1924.  She went into service on 9 February 1924 with a speed of 14.5 knots and completely filled the San Francisco Ferry Building slip.  She was rated to carry 4,000 passengers, but only had seating for 1,900.  After the San Francisco–Oakland Bay Bridge and Golden Gate Bridge opened in 1936 and 1937, Southern Pacific passenger ferry service was reduced to a single route between San Francisco and the Oakland Pier in 1939.  Sacramento became the standby boat when the ferries assigned to that route needed repair.  As the other ferries wore out during World War II, Sacramento became one of two boats in active service until suffering a major mechanical failure on 28 November 1954.  The ferry was stripped of machinery and towed to Southern California to be a moored fishing platform near Redondo Beach, California where she sank during a storm on 1 December 1964.

Bay City

Bay City stayed on the Alameda route under Southern Pacific ownership, and survived collision with the lumber schooner Tampico on a foggy day in 1906.  She lost a rudder and had several lifeboats smashed on 5 April 1911 when misunderstood signals caused collision with the Southern Pacific ferry Berkeley.  On 8 July 1912, Bay City lost power when the engine main shaft broke, and drifted in the mid-bay until a tug arrived to tow her ashore.  Southern Pacific ferry Melrose collided with Bay City in a dense patch of fog on 26 January 1913.  Bay City was repaired after each mishap; and stayed in trans-bay service until dismantled for scrap in 1929.

Garden City
Garden City was built with a  narrow gauge track on the main deck to carry freight cars to San Francisco; but she could also carry passengers as a relief ferry when either of the other two ferries needed repairs.  Southern Pacific used Garden City as a relief boat for their auto ferry run on the old "creek route".  Garden City stayed on the "creek route" as a passenger ferry when auto ferry service was shifted to the Oakland pier.

Garden City attempted an eastbound bay crossing during a full gale on Christmas morning, 1921.  After steaming into the wind for 90 minutes on what was normally an 18-minute trip, the ferry found its destination slip was occupied by the ferry Edward T. Jeffery seeking shelter from the storm.  The other ferry vacated the slip, but Garden City was unable to maneuver in the wind, and started drifting when its rudder broke while attempting to return to San Francisco.  A rescue tug arrived and took the ferry in tow, but the tow line parted, and the ferry drifted into the Key system pier.  The pier was seriously damaged and the ferry passengers were drenched by waves breaking 20 feet high as they crawled to safety.  Southern Pacific retired Garden City the following year; but traffic remained so heavy through the 1920s that the boat was repeatedly pulled out of retirement for temporary service when other boats needed repair.  After her last run in 1929, the old ferry was moored as a fishing resort in Eckley, California. Eckley is gone, the site now being part of Carquinez Strait Regional Shoreline Park, and the remains of the Garden City are easily visible from the park's Eckley fishing pier.

Surviving infrastructure
Trackage
The north–south line from Oakland, California to San Jose, California is operated by the Union Pacific Railroad as the Coast Subdivision.  Between Newark, California and San Jose it is used by Amtrak's Capitol Corridor and Coast Starlight trains and the Altamont Corridor Express commuter rail service.
 The Dumbarton Cutoff connecting Niles and Newark is immediately south of the SPC branch line from Newark to the Fremont Amtrak station in the Centerville District. 
The line running southwest from San Jose towards the Santa Cruz mountains still exists as far as Vasona Junction, and is operated by the Union Pacific Railroad.  The right of way is shared with the southwest end of the VTA light rail Vasona corridor (now Green Line), which opened in 2005, operated by the Santa Clara Valley Transportation Authority between Campbell, California and San Jose Diridon station.
The western end of the Santa Cruz mountain crossing, from Olympia, California to Santa Cruz, California is now the Santa Cruz, Big Trees and Pacific Railway, primarily a tourist operation but also carries lumber. Operations include the southernmost (Mission Hill) tunnel.

Stations
Agnew Depot was used by the Southern Pacific and was purchased by the California Central Model Railroad Club in 1963.
San Jose Diridon station is located on the site of the former South Pacific Coast San Jose station.

See also 

 Ilwaco Railway and Navigation Company
 Society for the Preservation of Carter Railroad Resources

Notes

References

External links 

 Old Santa Cruz, CA Railroad Tunnels
 The Story Behind Those Old Train Tunnels in the Santa Cruz Mountains by Peter Arcuni, KQED article and podcast, April 15, 2021.

3 ft gauge railways in the United States
Predecessors of the Southern Pacific Transportation Company
History of San Francisco
Defunct California railroads
Narrow gauge railroads in California